Hanreuchai Netsiri (born 3 November 1979) is a Thai Paralympic archer.

In the 2016 Summer Paralympics, his debut games, Netsiri won his first Paralympic medal which was silver. He was the 2013 World Para-Archery Champion in Men's Recurve (W2).

References

Hanreuchai Netsiri
Archers at the 2016 Summer Paralympics
Hanreuchai Netsiri
Living people
Hanreuchai Netsiri
1979 births
Medalists at the 2016 Summer Paralympics
Paralympic medalists in archery
Hanreuchai Netsiri